This is a list of the time offsets by U.S. states, federal district, and territories. For more about the time zones of the U.S. see time in the United States.

Most states are entirely contained within one time zone.  However, some states are in two time zones, due to geographical, socio-political or economic reasons.


States, federal district and territories

See also
 History of time in the United States
 List of time zones
 Time in the United States

References

External links

The Official U.S. Time in each time zone
North American Time Zone border data and images
NIST Internet Time Service 
US time zones differences 
USNO NTP Network Time Servers
U.S. Standard Time Zone map
U.S. cities and towns shown in their respective time zones at Internet Accuracy Project

Time zone